P. Narayana Kurup (born 5 September 1934) is a Malayalam–language poet and literary critic from Kerala state, South India.

Life
He was brought up in an ethos of music and temple art in his native village Haripad, Kerala. He took his degree in Science and Education from University College, Trivandrum and masters in English with distinction while serving in Central Ministry at Delhi. In addition to poetry, he has authored several significant works on satire, criticism and travel memoirs, among others. He has also chaired and helmed the operations of Thapasya (Forum for Art and Literature) and Margi (Centre for Classical Art) and is considered a connoisseur and critic of Kathakali and Koodiyattam.He was awarded India's fourth highest civilian award Padma Shri in January 2022.

Positions held

He was deputed as research officer to the Language Institute, Trivandrum and has served as Consulting Editor in Encyclopedic Publication of Kerala Govt and Assistant Editor and Editor in Publications Division, New Delhi. He was the editor of two encyclopedias published by D.C. Books (from 1985 to 1988). He was the governing body member of Kerala Kala Mandalam from 1986 to 1992. He was a trustee of Bharat Bhavan in Bhopal from 2004 to 2010. He had also held the position of Vice-President (All India) of Sanskar Bharati, Agra from 2000 to 2004. He was also a member of film advisory committee from 2002 to 2008. He was re-appointed to the committee in 2015 and still holds membership in the film advisory committee.

Currently

He is a member of the judging committee of Door Darshan Kendra at Delhi and in Trivandrum station. He is an expert member in Veda-Vyasa Brahma Vidya Peeth, Quilon Kerala. He is the patron of Thapasya (Forum for Art and Literature) after having been its president for 10 years. He is a member in Executive Committee of Margi (Centre for Classical Art). He is also the Vice President of Irayimman Thampi Smaraka Trust and Chairman of N. V. Krishna Warrier Smaraka Samithi.

Awards and achievements
Padma Shri in January 2022
Kerala Sahitya Akademi Award for Poetry in 1991
Kerala Sahitya Akademi Award for Literary Criticism in 1986
Odakkuzhal Award from Guruvayurappan Trust for poetry in 1990
State Children's Literature Award
Ulloor Award in 2002 for Poetry
Amrita Keerti Puraskar in 2005.
Janmashtami Award from Balagokulam in 2012
Sanjayan Award in 2015
Vallathol Award in 2014
Kerala Panini Puraskaram

Published works

References

1934 births
Living people
Writers from Alappuzha
Poets from Kerala
Malayalam-language writers
Malayalam poets
Malayalam literary critics
Recipients of the Kerala Sahitya Akademi Award
Indian male poets
20th-century Indian poets
20th-century Indian male writers

2. https://www.haripad.in/about-haripad/famous-people/p-narayana-kurup-the-famous-and-great-malayalam-litterateur/

3. https://www.newindianexpress.com/states/kerala/2014/oct/02/Vallathol-Prize-for-Narayana-Kurup-667289.html